Graeme John Ackland FRSE is professor of computer simulation at the University of Edinburgh.

His research concerns metallic hydrogen and other materials under high pressure. He has also applied simulations to non-physical problems including Neolithic migration and the spread of COVID-19.

References

External links 
ResearchGate page for Graeme J. Ackland

Living people
Year of birth missing (living people)
Academics of the University of Edinburgh
Computer scientists
Fellows of the Royal Society of Edinburgh
Fellows of the Institute of Physics
Alumni of Jesus College, Oxford